Roman Kukumberg (born April 8, 1980) is a Slovak professional ice hockey player who is currently playing for the Mountfield HK of the Czech Extraliga.

Kukemberg was selected by the Toronto Maple Leafs in the 4th round (113th overall) of the 2004 NHL Entry Draft and spent one season playing in the American Hockey League for the Toronto Marlies in the 2005-06 AHL season. He also played for HC Dukla Trenčín, HC Neftekhimik Nizhnekamsk, HC Slovan Bratislava, HC Lada Togliatti, Ak Bars Kazan, Traktor Chelyabinsk and Amur Khabarovsk.

Kukumberg also represented Slovakia in four IIHF World Championships.

Career statistics

Regular season and playoffs

International

References

1980 births
Ak Bars Kazan players
Amur Khabarovsk players
HC Slovan Bratislava players
Stadion Hradec Králové players
HC Lada Togliatti players
Living people
HC Neftekhimik Nizhnekamsk players
HK Nitra players
Ice hockey people from Bratislava
Slovak expatriate ice hockey players in the Czech Republic
Slovak ice hockey centres
HK Dukla Trenčín players
Toronto Maple Leafs draft picks
Toronto Marlies players
Traktor Chelyabinsk players
Slovak expatriate ice hockey players in Russia
Slovak expatriate ice hockey players in Canada